Senoji Varėna is an old village in Varėna district municipality, near Merkys River and Rivulet Varėnė confluence, 4 kilometers north of Varėna, on the road Vilnius–Druskininkai. The village was mentioned for the first time in Teutonic letters in the year 1413.

It was the hometown of the most famous Lithuanian painter and composer Mikalojus Konstantinas Čiurlionis.

Name origins 
The village name comes from the Varėnė river which goes through it. There is a legend in folk stories that name Varėna comes from goddess Varėnė who was taking care of hunters and fishermen living by the river.

Villages in Alytus County